The Defector is a 1966 thriller film starring Montgomery Clift, Hardy Krüger, Roddy McDowall and Macha Méril. It was directed by Belgian director/producer Raoul Lévy and based on the 1965 novel L'espion (The Spy) by Paul Thomas.

This was Clift's final film, and he only agreed to the part so that he could prepare himself for his next role in the 1967 film Reflections in a Golden Eye (the role went to Marlon Brando). Although obviously very ill (he died less than three months after most of the shooting was completed), Clift still managed to give a convincing performance in what has been termed a very moody and somber film. This characterization is in stark contrast to the exuberance displayed by his love interest, who was played by Méril, an obviously more youthful woman.

Lévy committed suicide on December 31, 1966, less than two months after the film's American release.

Plot
American physicist Professor Bower is effectively blackmailed by a shady CIA agent named Adams to help the CIA obtain secret microfilm from a defecting Russian scientist. The reluctant Bower travels to East Germany undercover as an antiques collector, where he encounters Heinzmann, an East German fellow physicist who is also a secret agent. Heinzmann is aware of Bower's meeting with Adams and of his intention to steal the microfilm, but their mutual respect for one another's tactics complicate the proceedings.

Cast
 Montgomery Clift as Prof. James Bower
 Hardy Krüger as Counselor Peter Heinzmann
 Macha Méril as Frieda Hoffman
 Roddy McDowall as Agent Adams
 David Opatoshu as Orlovsky
 Christine Delaroche as Ingrid
 Hannes Messemer as Dr. Saltzer
 Karl Lieffen as The Major

Production
Plans for the film, based on the novel The Spy, were announced in January 1966. It was Montgomery Clift's first film appearance in four years. The original stars announced were Clift, Monica Vitti and Hardy Krüger. Filming was to begin on January 29, 1966 in Munich at the Regina Hotel and at the Bavaria Atellier Gestellschaft Studio on a budget of $1.5 million. Levy had previously made Hail Mafia with Seven Arts.

Filming was pushed back until March, meaning that Vitti had to drop out, and she was replaced by Leslie Caron. Then Caron gave up her role shortly before filming began in Munich in March 1966. Nicole Courcel also left the cast and was replaced by Macha Méril. Filming proceeded relatively smoothly in sharp contrast to other later-period Clift films.

Filming was completed in June 1966. Clift returned to New York, where he died the following month.

Reception

Critics' response
Critics were generally favorable to the film. Bosley Crowther of the New York Times said, "Mr. Clift is apt in this his last film — lonely, bewildered, courageous - it's just too bad it doesn't quite ring the bell." The Los Angeles Times said Clift was "first rate" but called the film "second rate."

Box office
The film was not a box-office success in France.

Notes

References

External links
 
 

1966 films
Cold War spy films
French spy drama films
German spy drama films
French spy thriller films
German spy thriller films
West German films
1960s spy drama films
1960s spy thriller films
Films based on American novels
Films based on thriller novels
Films set in Germany
Films shot in Bavaria
Films about the Central Intelligence Agency
English-language French films
English-language German films
Films scored by Serge Gainsbourg
1966 drama films
Films set in East Germany
1960s English-language films
1960s French films
1960s German films